Balón de Oro, also referred to as Mexican Golden Ball, is an annual Mexican awards ceremony by the Mexican Federation of Association Football to the best association football players, head coaches, and referees of the Liga MX each season. Until 1997, it was an annual award, afterwards the prize was rewarded at the end of the football season. Since 1996/97 the single championship was split into two single-round tournaments, giving birth to the current Apertura and Clausura arrangement, and Balón de Oro is followed them. In 2001/02 no awards were handed out as the officials forgot about organising an election. The ceremony entered a 4-year hiatus following the 2012 Clausura until the 2015–16 Liga MX season.

The Mexican Best Footballer (that literally translates to Golden Ball to the Best Football Player) is a half-yearly award given by the Mexican Federation of Association Football as one of the Balón de Oro Awards.

Winners

By player

By country

By club

References

Mexico
Football in Mexico
Mexican awards
Awards established in 1975
1975 establishments in Mexico
Annual events in Mexico